Jason Jessee (born December 29th  is an American professional skateboarder and automotive designer best known for his stint with Santa Cruz Skateboards in the late 1980s. He was identified as the 24th most influential skateboarder of all time by TransWorld SKATEboarding magazine in 2011. The feature documentary Pray for Me: The Jason Jessee Film was released in 2007.

Skateboarding
Jessee's first sponsor was Powell Peralta and later Vision Street Wear, but made the move to a professional sponsorship deal with Santa Cruz Skateboards in December 1987. He notably featured in the company's 1988 highlight video Streets on Fire, in which he played a fictional version of himself who is arrested and jailed for illegal skateboarding. After an extended period of absence from the skateboarding industry, Jessee was once again sponsored by Santa Cruz and he helped the company during its 40th-anniversary celebration in 2013.

In June 2012, Converse Skateboarding posted a short video on its YouTube channel welcoming Jessee as a company ambassador, which was shot at Jessee's rural California home and featured footage of his motorcycle riding and skateboarding. Jessee appeared in the 2018 film Converse PURPLE, but was then "indefinitely suspended" by Converse in May 2018 — during which he also made his first Thrasher magazine cover appearance — after details of his controversial past surfaced.

Alongside other professional skateboarders such as Tony Hawk and Kevin Staab, Jessee was interviewed for the 2002 feature documentary Stoked: The Rise and Fall of Gator, about the tragedy of former professional skateboarder Mark "Gator" Rogowski. Jessee later described Rogowski in a June 2014 interview as a "creep".

Other ventures
Jessee has additionally worked as a custom-car and motorcycle builder, and was briefly a member of Los Angeles-based lowrider car club Dukes.

Controversy 
Jessee came under controversy in May 2018 when a thread on an online forum hosted by Slap magazine alleged his past usage of racial slurs, hate speech, and Nazi imagery. The thread was later deleted but Vice published an article that month about the allegations, including details of a brawl at a skateboarding contest in 1986 between Jessee and African-American skateboarder Ned "Peanut" Brown, during which Jessee had reportedly called Brown "nigger". Jessee consequently lost all of his endorsements, including that with NHS, the parental company of Santa Cruz Skateboards.

Legal issues
On January 4, 2006, Jessee was removed from a flight and arrested at San Jose International Airport after passengers aboard the flight reported him writing in a journal that had the words "suicide bomber" written on the cover, in addition to his "acting bizarrely" and "clutching his backpack".

He was arrested in April 2019 in Watsonville, California for possession of a stolen vehicle and an unregistered  and illegally-configured assault rifle.

References

External links

Jason Jessee "Pray for Me"

American skateboarders
Living people
People from Watsonville, California
Place of birth missing (living people)
1969 births